Matthew the Apostle (Saint Matthew) is named in the New Testament as one of the twelve apostles of Jesus. According to Christian traditions, he was also one of the four Evangelists as author of the Gospel of Matthew, and thus is also known as Matthew the Evangelist, a claim rejected by most biblical scholars, though the "traditional authorship still has its defenders."

The New Testament records that as a disciple, he followed Jesus, and was one of the witnesses of the Ascension of Jesus. Later Church fathers such as Irenaeus and Clement of Alexandria claim that Matthew preached the Gospel to the Jewish community in Judea, before going to other countries.

In the New Testament

He is also listed among the twelve, but without identification of his background, in Mark 3:18, Luke 6:15 and Acts 1:13. In passages parallel to Matthew 9:9, both Mark 2:14 and Luke 5:27 describe Jesus's calling of the tax collector Levi, the son of Alphaeus, but Mark and Luke never explicitly equate this Levi with the Matthew named as one of the twelve apostles.

Ministry
The New Testament records that as a disciple, he followed Jesus, and was one of the witnesses of the Ascension of Jesus. Afterwards, the disciples withdrew to an upper room (Acts 1:10–14)(traditionally the Cenacle) in Jerusalem. The disciples remained in and about Jerusalem and proclaimed that Jesus was the promised Messiah.

In the Babylonian Talmud (Sanhedrin 43a), "Mattai" is one of five disciples of "Jeshu".

Early Church fathers such as Irenaeus (Against Heresies 3.1.1) and Clement of Alexandria say that Matthew preached the Gospel to the Jewish community in Judea, before going to other countries. Ancient writers are not in agreement as to which other countries these are, but almost all sources mention Ethiopia. The Catholic Church and the Orthodox Church each hold the tradition that Matthew died as a martyr and the Babylonian Talmud appears to report his execution in Sanhedrin 43a. 

According to Church tradition, while preaching in Ethiopia, Matthew converted and then consecrated to God, Ephigenia of Ethiopia, the virgin daughter of the Ethiopian King Egippus. When King Hirtacus succeeded Egippus, he asked the apostle if he could persuade Ephigenia to marry him. Matthew thus invited King Hirtacus to Mass the following Sunday where he rebuked him for lusting after the girl, as she was a nun and therefore was the bride of Christ. The enraged King thus ordered his bodyguard to kill Matthew who stood at the altar, making him a martyr.

Matthew's Gospel

Early church tradition holds that the gospel of Matthew was written by the apostle Matthew. This tradition is first attested, among the extant writings of the first and second centuries, with the early Christian bishop Papias of Hierapolis (c. AD 60–163), who is cited by the Church historian Eusebius (AD 260–340), as follows: "Matthew collected the oracles (logia: sayings of or about Jesus) in the Hebrew language (Hebraïdi dialektōi), and each one interpreted (hērmēneusen – perhaps "translated") them as best he could." Likewise, early Christian Theologian Origen (c. 184 – c. 253) indicates that the first Gospel was written by Matthew, and that his Gospel was composed in Hebrew near Jerusalem for Hebrew Christians and translated into Greek. The Hebrew original was kept at the Library of Caesarea. Sometime in the late fourth or early fifth century the Nazarene Community transcribed a copy for Jerome which he used in his work. Matthew's Gospel was called the Gospel according to the Hebrews or sometimes the Gospel of the Apostles and it was once believed that it was the original to the Greek Matthew found in the Bible. However, this has been challenged by modern biblical scholars such as Bart D. Ehrman and James R. Edwards. See also the two-source hypothesis.

On the surface, Papias' statement has been taken to imply that Matthew's Gospel itself was written in Hebrew or Aramaic by the apostle Matthew and later translated into Greek. However, scholars contend that the author does not claim to have been an eyewitness to events, and Matthew's Greek "reveals none of the telltale marks of a translation". Accordingly, several theories have been put forward several theories to explain Papias: perhaps Matthew wrote two gospels, one, now lost, in Hebrew, the other our Greek version; or perhaps the logia was a collection of sayings rather than the gospel; or by dialektōi Papias may have meant that Matthew wrote in the Jewish style rather than in the Hebrew language. The consensus is that Papias does not describe the Gospel of Matthew as we know it, and it is generally accepted that Matthew was written in Greek, not in Aramaic or Hebrew. 

Most modern scholars hold that the Gospel of Matthew was written anonymously, and not by Matthew.  The author is not named within the text, and scholars have proposed that the superscription "according to Matthew" was added sometime in the second century.

Non-canonical or apocryphal gospels

In the 3rd century, Jewish–Christian gospels attributed to Matthew were used by Jewish–Christian groups such as the Nazarenes and Ebionites. Fragments of these gospels survive in quotations by Jerome, Epiphanius and others. Most academic study follows the distinction of Gospel of the Nazarenes (36 fragments), Gospel of the Ebionites (7 fragments), and Gospel of the Hebrews (7 fragments) found in Schneemelcher's New Testament Apocrypha. Critical commentators generally regard these texts as having been composed in Greek and related to Greek Matthew. A minority of commentators consider them to be fragments of a lost Aramaic- or Hebrew-language original.

The Gospel of Pseudo-Matthew is a 7th-century compilation of three other texts: the Gospel of James, the Flight into Egypt, and the Infancy Gospel of Thomas.

Jerome relates that Matthew was supposed by the Nazarenes to have composed their Gospel of the Hebrews though Irenaeus and Epiphanius of Salamis consider this simply a revised version of the canonical Gospel. This Gospel has been partially preserved in the writings of the Church Fathers, said to have been written by Matthew. Epiphanius does not make his own the claim about a Gospel of the Hebrews written by Matthew, a claim that he merely attributes to the heretical Ebionites.

Veneration
Matthew is recognized as a saint in the Roman Catholic, Eastern Orthodox, Lutheran and Anglican churches (see St. Matthew's Church). His feast day is celebrated on 21 September in the West and 16 November in the East. (Those churches which follow the traditional Julian calendar would keep the day on 29 November of the modern Gregorian calendar, being 16 November in the Julian calendar.) He is also commemorated by the Orthodox, together with the other Apostles, on 30 June (13 July), the Synaxis of the Holy Apostles. His tomb is located in the crypt of Salerno Cathedral in southern Italy. Matthew is remembered in the Church of England with a Festival on 21 September.

Like the other evangelists, Matthew is often depicted in Christian art with one of the four living creatures of Revelation 4:7. The one that accompanies him is in the form of a winged man. The three paintings of Matthew by Caravaggio in the church of San Luigi dei Francesi in Rome, where he is depicted as called by Christ from his profession as a tax gatherer, are among the landmarks of Western art.

In Islam
The Quran speaks of Jesus' disciples but does not mention their names, instead referring to them as "helpers to the work of Allah". Muslim exegesis and Quran commentary, however, name them and include Matthew amongst the disciples. Muslim exegesis preserves the tradition that Matthew and Andrew were the two disciples who went to Ethiopia to preach the message of God.

In architecture
The Basilica of Annunciation in Nazareth houses a capital that depicts Matthew the Apostle and his story regarding King Eglypus of Ethiopia and his sons. It shows how Matthew is leading them away from the demon in the far corner of the capital. The biblical story tells of Matthew converting the king and his sons to Christianity. Not only does this capital depict an act carried out by Matthew in the Bible, it also foreshadowing Matthew being a martyr. When Matthew the Apostle was murdered, he then became a martyr for the Christian religion as being killed for his faith and teachings given the demon in the corner of the capitol. The iconography of this capital helps understand the religion of the time period since it was just coming into Christendom. This shows the cross between Ethiopia and Nazareth as these are where the capitals are today.

In fiction
The Master and Margarita

Gallery

See also
Mark the Evangelist
Luke the Evangelist
John the Apostle
Saint Matthew the Apostle, patron saint archive

References

Notes

Citations

Sources

Further reading

 
 
 
 
 
 
 
 
 
 
 
 
 
 
 
 
 
 
 
 
 
 
 , in 
 , in 
 
 
 
 , in 
 
 
 
 
 , in 
 , in

Commentaries

External links

St Matthew the Apostle from The Golden Legend
Apostle and Evangelist Matthew Orthodox icon and synaxarion
Benedict XVI, "Matthew", General audience, 30 August 2006
"The Caravaggio Effect"

 
1st-century Christian martyrs
1st-century writers
Burials at Salerno Cathedral
Christian saints from the New Testament
Four Evangelists
Saints from the Holy Land
Twelve Apostles
Year of birth unknown
Year of death unknown
Anglican saints